William Boniface (born October 17, 1963) is an author of children's picture books, including the Five Little... series, Max the Minnow series, and The Extraordinary Adventures of an Ordinary Boy series. The Ordinary Boy books, which focus on a setting where everybody has a superpower, have been recommended for classroom use.

Works
The Adventures of Max the Minnow (illustrated by Don Sullivan)
Mystery in Bugtown (illustrated by Jim Harris)
Max Makes Millions: The Adventures of Max Continue (illustrated by Daniel Vasconcellos)
The Treasure Hunter (illustrated by Jim Harris)
The Extraordinary Adventures of an Ordinary Boy: The Hero Revealed (illustrated by Stephen Gilpin)
The Extraordinary Adventures of an Ordinary Boy: The Great Powers Outage (illustrated by Stephen Gilpin)
The Extraordinary Adventures of an Ordinary Boy: The Return of the Meteor Boy? (illustrated by Stephen Gilpin)
Lights Out, Night's Out (illustrated by Milena Kirkova)
Welcome to Dinsmore the World's Greatest Store (illustrated by Tom Kerr)
Five Little Ghosts
Five Little Candy Hearts
Five Little Easter Eggs
Christmastime Is Cookie Time
The Stars Came Out on Christmas

References

1963 births
American writers
Living people